Sompa  may refer to:
Sompa (film), a 2012 Tulu language film
Sompa, Kohtla-Järve, a district of Kohtla-Järve, Estonia
Sompa village, a village in Jõhvi Parish, Estonia